

Men's single

Seeds

  Rajah Menuri Venkata Gurusaidutt (Qualified)
  Ville Lang (Not Qualified)
  Derek Wong Zi Liang (Not Qualified)
  Gao Huan (Qualified)

Qualifying draw

First qualifier

Second qualifier

Third qualifier

Fourth qualifier

Women's single

Key

PFQ = Promoted From Qualifiers
PFR = Promoted From Reserves

Seeds

  Chen Jiayuan (PFQ)
  Sonia Cheah Su Ya (PFQ)
  Sannatasah Saniru (Not Qualified)
  Yang Li Lian (Not Qualified)

Qualifying draw

First qualifier

Second qualifier

Third qualifier

Fourth qualifier

Men's double

Key

PFQ = Promoted From Qualifiers
PFR = Promoted From Reserves

Seeds

  Robert Blair/ Tan Bin Shen (PFQ)
  Kang Ji-Wook/Lee Sang-Joon (Qualified)
  Bona Septano/Afiat Yuris Wirawan (Not Qualified)
  Terry Yeo Zhao Jiang/Liu Yi (Not Qualified)

Qualifying draw

First qualifier

Second qualifier

Third qualifier

Fourth qualifier

Women's double

Seeds

  Cynthia Tuwankotta/ Claudia Vogelgsang (Not Qualified)
  Ho Yen Mei/Yap Rui Chen (Qualified)
  Goh Yea Ching/Peck Yen Wei (Qualified)
  Eng Pui Yee/Yap Zhen (Not Qualified)

Qualifying draw

First qualifier

Second qualifier

Third qualifier

Fourth qualifier

Mixed double

Key

PFQ = Promoted From Qualifiers
PFR = Promoted From Reserves

Seeds

  Liu Yi/Thng Ting Ting (PFQ)
  Oliver Roth/Johanna Goliszewski (Not Qualified)
  Sam Magee/Chloe Magee (Not Qualified)
  Yin Wong Fai/Lai Shevon Jemie (Not Qualified)

Qualifying draw

First qualifier

Second qualifier

Third qualifier

Fourth qualifier

External links 
tournamentsoftware.com

2013 Malaysia Super Series - Qualification
Malaysia Super Series - Qualification
Sport in Kuala Lumpur
Malaysia Super Series - Qualification